On June 5, 2017, John Robert Neumann Jr., a 45-year-old former employee of Fiamma, killed five former colleagues and himself. Orange County Mayor Jerry Demings said Neumann did not appear to belong to any kind of subversive or terrorist group.

Shooting
John Robert Neumann Jr. let himself into the building through a rear entrance and was armed with a handgun and a large hunting knife. He singled out his five victims and shot them in their heads. He then fatally shot himself as deputies responded to the scene. Eight other employees who worked at the company and were present during the shooting escaped without injury.

The shooting occurred one week before the first anniversary of the Orlando nightclub shooting, which had been the deadliest mass shooting by a lone gunman in U.S. history at the time.

Victims
The five victims were Robert Snyder, 69, lead manager at the factory; Brenda Montanez-Crespo, 44; Kevin Clark, 53; Jeffrey Roberts, 57; and Kevin Lawson, 46. A local youth sports league raised money for the children of Kevin Clark, who were orphaned, as their mother had died nine years earlier in 2008.

Perpetrator

John Robert Neumann Jr. (May 2, 1972 – June 5, 2017) received an honorable discharge from the U.S. Army in 1999. He did not have a concealed weapons permit. He had a history of minor crimes before the shooting, mostly associated with traffic.

Neumann once worked for Fiamma, which made awnings for recreational vehicles and campervans. He was fired in April 2017 for starting fights with people. The lead manager who fired him later feared he would return for revenge. Police dealt with him in 2014 when he was accused of battering a coworker at the factory.

References

2010s in Orlando, Florida
2017 in Florida
2017 mass shootings in the United States
Mass shootings in the United States
2017 murders in the United States
Attacks in the United States in 2017
Attacks on buildings and structures in the United States
Deaths by firearm in Florida
June 2017 crimes in the United States
Mass murder in 2017
Murder in Florida
Murder–suicides in Florida
Mass shootings in Florida
Workplace shootings in the United States
2017 active shooter incidents in the United States